George Upton may refer to:

George Upton (died 1609) (1553–1609), Member of the English Parliament in 1584, 1601 and 1604
George Upton, 3rd Viscount Templetown (1802–1890), Irish soldier and politician
George Bruce Upton (1804–1874), American shipbuilder and politician in Massachusetts
George Putnam Upton (1834–1919), American journalist and author